Bramham may refer to:

People 
 Christopher Bramham (born 1952), British painter
 Sam Bramham (born 1988), Australian Paralympic swimmer
 William G. Bramham (1874–1947), American baseball executive

Places 
 Bramham cum Oglethorpe, a civil parish in West Yorkshire, England
 Bramham, West Yorkshire, a village in the parish
 Bramham Park, a historic house near the village
 Bramham Gari Matham, a pilgrimage site in Mydukur, India
 Bramham Island, British Columbia, Canada

Other uses 
 Battle of Bramham Moor, a battle on Bramham Moor near Wetherby
 HMS Bramham (L51), a Hunt-class destroyer of the Royal Navy
 Bramham Horse Trials, held at Bramham Park